Florent Indalecio (born 14 December 1997) is a French professional footballer, who plays for Australian club Dandenong Thunder as a forward.

Career
Indalecio began his career with the youth team of Saint-Étienne, but was released by the club at the age of 15 due to poor behaviour. He then spent a number of unsuccessful trials at various clubs, including in the United States. A year later he was diagnosed with a tumour in his knee. He worked in a factory, whilst playing for amateur clubs Andrézieux-Bouthéon, Saint-Chamond and Hauts Lyonnais.

He then moved to Sydney, Australia, where he played with amateur team Fraser Park FC from January 2020, combining playing with a job working in construction, working as a bricklayer. He learned English whilst working on the construction sites. He made two competitive appearances for Fraser Park before the season ended due to COVID-19.

He moved to England in March 2020 to stay with Allan Saint-Maximin, a friend from Saint-Étienne. Following a trial with Newcastle United, he signed a short-term contract with the club in October 2020. Newcastle manager Steve Bruce said that Indalecio would initially play for the under-23 team, and had to "prove himself". Indalecio said he would repay the faith shown in him by Newcastle. Indalecio described it as his "second opportunity" in football. He was released by Newcastle at the end of the season.

After leaving Newcastle he signed for local non-league club Morpeth Town in October 2021, making two Cup appearances for them that month.

He returned to Australia in February 2022, signing for Dandenong Thunder.

References

1997 births
Living people
French footballers
AS Saint-Étienne players
Andrézieux-Bouthéon FC players
Fraser Park FC players
Newcastle United F.C. players
Morpeth Town A.F.C. players
Dandenong Thunder SC players
Association football forwards
French expatriate footballers
French expatriates in Australia
Expatriate soccer players in Australia
French expatriates in England
Expatriate footballers in England
Hauts Lyonnais players